Father Pandosy Mission, also known as the Okanagan Mission, was the original home for Father Pandosy in Kelowna, British Columbia. He moved to Kelowna in 1859 and started the first settlement of Europeans in that region.  

The Pandosy Mission has been restored as a museum.  It is owned by the Catholic Church and is jointly administered by the Okanagan Historical Society.

The area of the mission has been known as Okanagan Mission since, and is a neighbourhood of modern Kelowna.

External links
 Okanagan Historical Society

Tourist attractions in the Okanagan
First Nations history in British Columbia
Buildings and structures in Kelowna
1859 establishments in the British Empire